Unknown is a 2011 action-thriller film directed by Jaume Collet-Serra and starring Liam Neeson, Diane Kruger, January Jones, Aidan Quinn, Bruno Ganz, and Frank Langella. The film, produced by Joel Silver, Leonard Goldberg and Andrew Rona, is based on the 2003 French novel by Didier Van Cauwelaert published in English as Out of My Head which was adapted as the film's screenplay by Oliver Butcher and Stephen Cornwell. The narrative centers around a professor who wakes up from a four-day long coma and sets out to prove his identity after no one recognizes him, including his own wife, and another man claims to be him.

Released on 18 February 2011, the film received mixed reviews from critics and grossed $136 million against its $30 million budget.

Plot 

Martin Harris and his wife Liz arrive in Berlin for a biotechnology summit. At their hotel, Harris realizes he left his briefcase at the airport and takes a taxi to retrieve it. The taxi is involved in an accident and crashes into the Spree, knocking him unconscious. The driver rescues him but flees the scene. Harris regains consciousness at a hospital after being in a coma for four days.

When Harris returns to the hotel, he discovers Liz with another man. Liz says this man is her husband and declares she does not know Harris. The police are called, and Harris attempts to prove his identity by calling a colleague named Rodney Cole, to no avail. He writes down his schedule for the next day from memory. When he visits the office of Professor Leo Bressler, whom he is scheduled to meet, "Dr. Harris" is already there. As Harris attempts to prove his identity, "Harris" provides identification and a family photo, both of which have his face. Overwhelmed by the identity crisis, Harris loses consciousness and awakens back at the hospital. A terrorist named Smith kills Harris's attending nurse, but Harris is able to escape from him.

Harris seeks help from a private investigator and former Stasi agent Ernst Jürgen. Harris's only clues are his father's book on botany and Gina, the taxi driver, an undocumented Bosnian immigrant who has been working at a diner since the crash. While Harris persuades her to help him, Jürgen researches Harris and the biotechnology summit, discovering it is to be attended by Prince Shada of Saudi Arabia. The prince is funding a secret project headed by Bressler, and has survived numerous assassination attempts. Jürgen suspects that the identity theft might be related.

Harris and Gina are attacked in her apartment by Smith and another terrorist, Jones; they escape after Gina kills Smith. Harris finds that Liz has written a series of numbers in his book, numbers that correspond to words found on specific pages. Using his schedule, Harris confronts Liz alone; she tells him that he left his briefcase at the airport. Meanwhile, Jürgen receives Cole at his office and reveals his findings of a secret terrorist group known as Section 15. Jürgen soon deduces that Cole is a former mercenary and member of the group. Knowing Cole is there to interrogate and kill him and with no way of escape, Jürgen commits suicide to protect Harris.

After retrieving his briefcase, Harris parts ways with Gina. When she sees him kidnapped by Cole and Jones, she steals a taxi and follows them. When Harris awakes, Cole explains that "Martin Harris" is just a cover name created by Harris. His head injury caused him to believe the cover persona was real; when Liz notified Cole of the injury, "Harris" was activated as his replacement. Gina runs over Jones before he can kill Harris, then rams Cole's van off a ledge, killing him as well. After Harris finds a hidden compartment in his briefcase containing two Canadian passports, he remembers that he and Liz were in Berlin three months earlier to plant a bomb in Prince Shada's suite.

Now aware of his own role in the assassination plot, Harris seeks to redeem himself by thwarting it. Hotel security immediately arrests Harris and Gina, but Harris proves his earlier visit to the hotel. After security is convinced of the bomb's presence, they evacuate the hotel.

Harris realizes that Section 15's target is not Prince Shada, but Bressler, who has developed a genetically modified breed of corn capable of surviving harsh climates. Liz accesses Bressler's laptop and steals the data. With Bressler's death and the theft of his research, billions of dollars would fall into the wrong hands. Seeing that the assassination attempt has been foiled, Liz tries to disarm the bomb but fails and is killed when it explodes. Harris kills "Harris", the last remaining Section 15 terrorist, before he can murder Bressler. While Bressler announces that he is giving his project to the world for free, Harris and Gina—with new identities—board a train together.

Cast 

 Liam Neeson as Martin Harris
 Diane Kruger as Gina
 January Jones as Elizabeth "Liz" Harris
 Aidan Quinn as imposter Martin
 Frank Langella as Rodney Cole
 Bruno Ganz as Ernst Jürgen, a former Stasi operative
 Sebastian Koch as Professor Bressler
 Stipe Erceg as Jones
 Olivier Schneider as Smith
 Rainer Bock as Herr Strauss (chief of hotel security)
 Mido Hamada as Prince Shada
 Karl Markovics as Dr. Farge
 Eva Löbau as Nurse Gretchen Erfurt
 Clint Dyer as Biko
 
Many German actors were cast for the film. Bock had previously starred in Inglourious Basterds (which also starred Diane Kruger) and The White Ribbon. Other cast includes Adnan Maral as a Turkish taxi driver and Petra Schmidt-Schaller as an immigration officer. Kruger herself is also German, despite playing a non-German character.

Production 

Principal photography took place in early February 2010 in Berlin, Germany, and in the Studio Babelsberg film studios. The bridge the taxi plunges from is the Oberbaumbrücke. The Friedrichstraße was blocked for several nights for the shooting of a car chase. Some of the shooting was done in the Hotel Adlon. Locations include the Neue Nationalgalerie, Berlin Hauptbahnhof, Berlin Friedrichstraße station, Pariser Platz, Museum Island, the Oranienburger Straße in Berlin and the Leipzig/Halle Airport. According to Andrew Rona, the budget was $40 million. Producer Joel Silver's US company Dark Castle Entertainment contributed $30 million. German public film funds supported the production with €4.65 million (more than $6 million). The working title was Unknown White Male.

Release 
Unknown was screened out of competition at the 61st Berlin International Film Festival. It was released in the United States on 18 February 2011.

Critical response
On Rotten Tomatoes, a review aggregator, the film has an approval rating of 55% based on 200 reviews; the average rating is 5.81/10. The site's critical consensus reads, "Liam Neeson elevates the proceedings considerably, but Unknown is ultimately too derivative – and implausible – to take advantage of its intriguing premise." On Metacritic the film has an average weighted score of 56 out of 100, based on 38 critics, indicating "mixed or average reviews". Audiences polled by CinemaScore gave the film an average grade of "B+" on an A+ to F scale.

Richard Roeper gave the film a B+ and wrote, "At times, Unknown stretches plausibility to the near breaking point, but it's so well paced and the performances are so strong and most of the questions are ultimately answered. This is a very solid thriller." Justin Chang of Variety called it "an emotionally and psychologically threadbare exercise".

Box office
Unknown grossed $63.7 million in North America and $72.4 million in other territories for a worldwide total of $136.1 million.

It finished at number one opening at its first week of release with $21.9 million.

Television series 
In June 2021, it was announced that a sequel television series based on the film is in development at TNT. The project will be produced by Dark Castle Entertainment where Sean Finegan will write the pilot, Karl Gajdusek and Speed Weed will serve as executive producers and show runners, Neeson also will serve as executive producer and Collet-Serra will direct the pilot and executive produce.

References

External links 
 
 
 
 
 
 
 Unknown at The Numbers

2011 films
2011 action thriller films
2011 psychological thriller films
2010s American films
2010s British films
2010s English-language films
2010s French films
2010s German films
2010s German-language films
2010s mystery thriller films
American action thriller films
American chase films
American mystery thriller films
Babelsberg Studio films
British action thriller films
British chase films
British mystery thriller films
Dark Castle Entertainment films
English-language French films
English-language German films
Films about altered memories
Films about amnesia
Films about identity theft
Films about murder
Films about terrorism in Europe
Films based on French novels
Films directed by Jaume Collet-Serra
Films produced by Joel Silver
Films scored by John Ottman
Films set in Berlin
Films shot in Berlin
French action thriller films
French mystery thriller films
German action thriller films
German mystery thriller films
Thanksgiving in films
Warner Bros. films